Events in the year 2018 in Trinidad and Tobago.

Incumbents
 President: Anthony Carmona (until 19 March); Paula-Mae Weekes (from 19 March)
 Prime Minister: Keith Rowley
 Chief Justice: Ivor Archie

Events
19 January – Paula-Mae Weekes is elected new president

Deaths

2 January – Donna Carter, politician (born c.1944).

8 January – George Maxwell Richards, politician, former president (b. 1931).

1 July – Ayanna Dyette, volleyball player (b. 1986).

19 July – Jennifer Cassar, indigenous leader (Santa Rosa First Peoples Community) and civil servant, Carib Queen (b. 1951).

References

 
2010s in Trinidad and Tobago
Years of the 21st century in Trinidad and Tobago
Trinidad and Tobago
Trinidad and Tobago